Marshallia is a genus of plants in the tribe Helenieae within the family Asteraceae. Marshallia is native to the southeastern and south-central United States. A common name applied to most species in the genus is Barbara's buttons.

Description
Marshallia is found in open  habitats, such as roadsides, bogs, or open woodlands dominated by pines. Several species are associated with wetlands.

The typical blooming period is late spring (May) and early summer (June or early July). The small white-to-pinkish flowers occur in large, compact, spherical heads Marshallia are very attractive to pollinating insects, including butterflies and various beetles, such as flower chafers of the genus Euphoria.

 Species
 Marshallia angustifolia (Michx.) Pursh - TN
 Marshallia caespitosa Nutt. ex DC., puffballs. - TX OK KS MO AR LA 
 Marshallia graminifolia (Walt.) Small, grassleaf Barbara's buttons. - TX LA MS AL GA FL SC NC 
 †Marshallia grandiflora Beadle & F.E. Boynt., Appalachian Barbara's buttons. - NC 
 Marshallia legrandii Weakley, tall Barbara's buttons. - NC, VA
 Marshallia mohrii Beadle & F.E. Boynt, Mohr's Barbara's buttons. - AL GA
 Marshallia obovata (Walt.) Beadle & F.E. Boynt. spoonshape Barbara's buttons. - TN AL GA FL SC NC VA
 Marshallia pulchra W.M. Knapp, D.B. Poind. & Weakley beautiful Barbara’s buttons.  - TN KY WV MD PA
Marshallia ramosa Beadle & F.E.Boynt., southern Barbara's buttons. - FL GA
Marshallia trinervia (Walt.) Trel., broadleaf Barbara's buttons. - LA MS AL GA SC NC TN

Conservation

One species in the genus, Marshallia grandiflora (Appalachian Barbara's buttons) is extinct, having been wiped out in the early 20th century. It was formerly considered conspecific with Marshallia pulchra (Beautiful Barbara's buttons or Monongahela Barbara's buttons), which is endangered in Kentucky, Pennsylvania, and Tennessee, and has been extirpated in Maryland. That species is found in bogs and scoured riverbanks, and requires periodic flooding to maintain open habitat. Marshallia obovata (Spoonshape Barbara's buttons or Piedmont Barbara's buttons), is listed as endangered in Florida and threatened in Tennessee.

Etymology

The genus name was given by the botanist Schreber (in Genera Plantarum, 1791) to honor the Marshall family, uncle Humphry and nephew Moses, of Pennsylvania. They were botanists of the American colonial period, and cousins of the famous botanists and explorers John and William Bartram.

The origin of the common name "Barbara's buttons" is unknown. The flower heads do resemble buttons, but botanical references giving this name do not quote the Barbara which the name honors (Rickett 1975). The reference is possibly to Saint Barbara, though the association is obscure. Saint Barbara had long hair, and is also associated with lightning—perhaps the individual flowers resemble lightning bolts, or the whole head of flowers resembles Saint Barbara's long locks (Coin 2005). This common name was not, at any rate, widespread in the 19th century. It was not used in Southern Wildflowers and Trees (1901) or Plant Life Of Alabama (1901). The botanist B.W. Wells, in Natural Gardens of North Carolina (1932), called the plants "loudspeakers", referring to the megaphone shape of the individual flowers. The first printed use of the name "Barbara's buttons" is in Small's Manual of the Southeastern Flora (1933).

References

Further reading
 Channell, Robert Bennie (1955). A revisional study of the genus Marshallia Schreb (Compositae). Thesis (Ph. D.) Duke University.
 Duncan, Wilbur H., Marion B. Duncan (1999). Wildflowers of the Eastern United States. University of Georgia Press. .
 Lounsberry, Alice (1901). Southern Wild Flowers and Trees. New York: Frederick A. Stokes Company.
 Mohr, Charles T. (1901). Plant Life Of Alabama. Montgomery, Alabama: Brown Printing Company.
 Porcher, Richard D., Douglas A. Rayner (2002), A Guide to the Wildflowers of South Carolina. University of South Carolina Press. .
 Radford, Albert E., H.E. Ahles, and C. R. Bell (1968). Manual of the Vascular Flora of the Carolinas. Chapel Hill, North Carolina: University of North Carolina Press. .
 Rickett, Harold (1975).  Wildflowers of the United States II(2):  630. New York: McGraw-Hill.
 Small, John Kunkel (1933). Manual of Southeastern Flora. Chapel Hill: University of North Carolina Press.
 Wells, B.W. (1932, reprint 2002). Natural Gardens of North Carolina. Chapel Hill: University of North Carolina Press. .
 Center for Plant Conservation account for Marshallia grandiflora, accessed 25 May 2006

External links
 USDA Plants Profile: Marshallia

Helenieae
Asteraceae genera
Endemic flora of the United States
Flora of the United States
Flora of the Southeastern United States